Vladimir I may refer to:

 Vladimir I of Kiev (c. 958 – 1015)
 Vladimir I of Novgorod (1020–1052)